Aslia lefevrii is a species of sea cucumber belonging to the family Cucumariidae.

The species is found in the eastern coasts of Atlantic Ocean.

References

Cucumariidae
Animals described in 1882
Fauna of the Atlantic Ocean